The following events occurred in January 1960:

January 1, 1960 (Friday)
The Republic of Cameroun became independent at midnight local time (2300 12/31/59 GMT) with the lowering of the French tricolor, and the raising of a new tricolor (red, yellow and green) flag at Yaoundé. The former French Cameroons colony had been under a U.N. Trusteeship during a transition period, and Prime Minister Ahmadou Ahidjo headed the government pending the adoption of a constitution. United Nations Secretary-General Dag Hammarskjöld, along with Henry Cabot Lodge, the American Ambassador to the U.N., were present, along with the Soviet First Deputy Premier, Frol Kozlov, who announced that the Soviets would recognize the new government. Marxist Félix-Roland Moumié, who had previously been supported by the Soviet Union, continued to wage a campaign of terrorism against the Ahidjo government, and thirty people were killed on the Republic's first day.
Midnight, January 1, 1960, is the point from which dates are measured under SAS System, Stata and R computer programming software.
The symbolic "Doomsday Clock" on the cover of the Bulletin of the Atomic Scientists was moved back five minutes, from "two minutes to midnight" (where it had been since 1953) to "seven minutes to midnight".
Cities created through merger in Norway-- Smøla (from Edøy, Brattvær, and Hopen); Evje og Hornnes (from Evje and Hornnes); and Sirdal (from Tonstad and Øvre Sirdal).
The peaceful New Year's Day March, a civil rights march at the airport of Greenville, South Carolina, took place with 250 African-American people protesting racial segregation. On October 25, a delegation of NAACP members had been waiting for the arrival of baseball great Jackie Robinson when they were told to move to a colored waiting room at the airport. Led by the chairman of the local Congress of Racial Equality (CORE), the Reverend J.S. Hall, the march concluded with the reading of a resolution by Rev. Matthew D. McCullough while a crowd of 200 White people listened.   
Died: Margaret Sullavan, 50, American film actress, died of an accidental overdose of barbiturates

January 2, 1960 (Saturday)
The temperature in Oodnadatta, South Australia, reached 50.7 °C (123.3 °F) in the shade, for what remains the highest temperature ever recorded in Australia.
At the Senate Caucus room in Washington, U.S. Senator John F. Kennedy of Massachusetts formally announced that he would seek the Democratic nomination for President of the United States.  Addressing a question about whether being a Roman Catholic would affect his chances of winning, Senator Kennedy told them "I would think that there is really only one issue involved in the whole question of a candidate's religion, that is, does a candidate believe in the separation of church and state?"
Born: Naoki Urasawa, Japanese manga author, in Tokyo
Died: Friedrich Adler, 80, Austrian assassin who had killed Austrian Prime Minister Karl von Stürgkh in 1916.

January 3, 1960 (Sunday)
The CBS Sports Spectacular made its debut at 3:00 EST, with Bud Palmer, with the aim of showing "sports you seldom see".  The first show featured a complete game between basketball's Harlem Globetrotters and their foils at that time, the Baltimore Rockets.

January 4, 1960 (Monday)
The EFTA Treaty was signed in Stockholm by Austria, Denmark, Norway, Portugal, Sweden, Switzerland and the United Kingdom, to form the European Free Trade Association, a 7-member alternative for nations that could not be, or did not want to be, in the six-nation European Economic Community. The treaty took effect on May 3, 1960.
The steel strike of 1959 was settled, three weeks before an injunction under the Taft-Hartley Act was set to expire, as Labor Secretary James P. Mitchell and Vice-President Richard M. Nixon mediated the dispute between the United Steelworkers Association and eleven steel manufacturers.

The Bank of France issued the first bills for the nouveau franc worth one hundred ancients francs, and brought back the centime coin, replacing the old franc. The new franc, at roughly five to U.S. dollar, had become legal tender on January 1. To prepare the French for the changeover, the old-style bills had been overstamped with new value and the initials "N.F."
Born: Michael Stipe, American rock singer (R.E.M.), in Decatur, Georgia
Died: Author Albert Camus was killed at  while riding as a passenger in a Facel-Vega sports car near the town being driven by his publisher, Michel Gallimard. The car left the road near Villeneuve-la-Guyard, striking a tree. An unfinished, 144-page manuscript of Camus' latest novel was found near the wreckage. The First Man would finally be published 35 years later.

January 5, 1960 (Tuesday)
British Prime Minister Harold Macmillan began a six-week,  tour of Britain's current and former African colonies, not returning to London until February 15.
Le Monde broke the news of a confidential report, made to the French government by the International Red Cross, documenting the French Army's torture in Algeria.
The Massachusetts Supreme Court ruled that a trust fund, set up by Benjamin Franklin's will in 1791 to assist "young married artificers", could not be divided before its 1991 maturity date, despite the fact that there were no more artificers who would benefit. Started by Franklin with the deposit of 1,000 pounds sterling, the fund had grown to $1,578,098 by 1960. By the time the monies were split between Massachusetts and Pennsylvania in 1991, the Fund was worth more than $6.5 million.

January 6, 1960 (Wednesday)
The Associations Law officially came into force in Iraq (coinciding with Army Day), allowing the legal registration of political parties. Prior to the adoption of this law, political parties had been banned in Iraq since 1954.
At the Johns Hopkins University Hospital in Baltimore, an emergency room intern, Dr. Henry Thomas, became the first person to save a life following CPR training. The technique of "closed chest compression" had been shown to Dr. Thomas and other physicians by Dr. James Jude whom developed it, but CPR had previously only been attempted during surgery. The patient, 45-year-old Eugene Barnes, had collapsed while removing his shirt for an examination. Dr. Thomas applied cardiopulmonary resuscitation and kept Barnes alive during a 22-minute wait for a defibrillator, and Barnes went on to a full recovery. The rest of the world would learn about CPR in the July 9, 1960, issue of the Journal of the American Medical Association.
The 29 passengers had been put on the Douglas DC-B for their Miami to New York flight, after their flight on a Boeing 707 had been cancelled. Killed in the crash was attorney Julian Frank, whose life had been insured by Dr. Robert Spears, listed as one of the dead from the 1959 crash of National Airlines Flight 967. Investigators concluded that Frank had unwittingly carried a bomb on board the plane inside his carry-on luggage. Dr. Spears was found and arrested in Arizona.
The Project Mercury data reduction plan was approved. Space Task Group's study entitled "Semi-Automatic Data Reduction" had been completed and submitted to NASA Headquarters for review on December 21, 1959.
Born:
Kari Jalonen, Finnish ice hockey player, in Oulu
Nigella Lawson, British chef and writer, in London
Howie Long, American football player, in Somerville, Massachusetts
Miriam O'Callaghan, Irish media personality, in Foxrock
Died: Edward Orrick McDonnell, United States Navy vice admiral, Medal of Honor recipient; in bombing of National Airlines Flight 2511 (b. 1891)

January 7, 1960 (Thursday)
The Soviet Union announced that it would be testing a long-range rocket over an area in the North Pacific Ocean, and warned other nations not to send ships through a designated  by  area between January 15 and February 15.
For the first time, a Polaris missile reached its target using its own inertial guidance system, rather than being directed from a ground station. The shot from Cape Canaveral came a few hours after President Eisenhower's final State of the Union speech, describing the new era of nuclear submarines armed with the Polaris missiles. "Impossible to destroy by surprise attack," said Ike, "they will become one of our most effective sentinels for peace."
Representatives of Engineering and Contracts Division and Flight Systems Division (FSD) met to discuss future wind tunnel test needs for advanced Mercury projects. After Alan B. Kehlet remarked on available test facilities, Caldwell C. Johnson and H. Kurt Strass presented their ideas on advanced configurations. Johnson had been working on modifications to the existing Mercury configuration, chiefly in the areas of afterbody, landing system (rotors to control impact point), and retro-escape system, rather than on advanced configuration concepts. Strass suggested that advanced work be classed as either (1) modifications refining the design of the present Mercury or (2) new concepts in configuration design, and others present agreed. Johnson consented to design models for both program categories. FSD's Aerodynamics Section would arrange for and perform tests necessary to evaluate both modifications and advanced proposals. Strass also suggested another modification, a larger heatshield diameter allowing for half-ringed flaps which could be extended from the portion of the afterbody near the heatshield to provide some subsonic lifting capabilities. Strass stated the need for aerodynamic information on an advanced Mercury configuration under consideration by his group, and on the lenticular vehicle proposed by Aerodynamics Section.
Died: Prince Ferdinand Pius, Duke of Calabria, 90, pretender to throne of Kingdom of Two Sicilies

January 8, 1960 (Friday)
Lee Harvey Oswald, an American defector to the Soviet Union, was personally welcomed by the Mayor of Minsk, given a free apartment, and then set up in a new job as a metal worker in the Byelorussian Radio and Television factory.
David Cooper Nelson became the first convict to be executed in New Mexico's gas chamber, and the last. The legislature had replaced the electric chair with gas, and would later adopt lethal injection as its mode of capital punishment.
The Los Angeles Rams sued the new American Football League and the Houston Oilers over the rights to Heisman Trophy winner Billy Cannon, who had signed with both teams.

January 9, 1960 (Saturday)
Kenneth Kaunda, the 35-year-old leader of the Zambian African National Congress, was released from prison on orders of the British Governor of Northern Rhodesia, Sir Evelyn Hone, a few weeks before Prime Minister Macmillan was scheduled to come to Lusaka.  When Northern Rhodesia became the Republic of Zambia, Kaunda would become its first President.
Construction began on the Aswan High Dam on the Nile River in Egypt, as President Nasser of the United Arab Republic pushed a button to explode 10 tons of dynamite.
On his 47th birthday, Vice-President Richard M. Nixon became a candidate for the Republican nomination for the President of the United States, by giving his assent to the placing of his name on the ballot for primary elections in Oregon, New Hampshire and Ohio.
Died: Elsie J. Oxenham, 79, British children's author, creator of the Abbey Girls series

January 10, 1960 (Sunday)
The United States would defend the Nationalist Chinese islands of Quemoy and Matsu from aggression by Communist China, U.S. Secretary of the Army Wilber M. Brucker said at a news conference in Taipei, marking a change in American policy.  The U.S. treaty to defend the island of Taiwan from attack did not include the two islands in the Taiwan Strait.  The issue of whether the United States should go to war with China over the two islands would become an issue in the 1960 presidential campaign.
Born:  
Brian Cowen, Prime Minister of Ireland 2008-2011; in Clara, County Offaly 
Samira Said, Moroccan singer, in Rabat

January 11, 1960 (Monday)
Henry Lee Lucas, who would confess to more than 600 murders in 1985, then recant, took his first life, stabbing his 74-year-old mother, Viola, at her home in Tecumseh, Michigan. Sentenced to 40 years in prison, but released in 1970, Lucas then resumed killing, and was ultimately convicted of 11 homicides.
U.S. Senator Theodore F. Green of Rhode Island, at 92, the oldest person to ever serve in either house of Congress up to that time, announced that he would not run in 1960 for a fifth term. Green served from 1935 to 1961 and would die at age 98 in 1966. U.S. Senator Strom Thurmond would surpass Green's record in 1995, serving until his death in 2003 at 100 years old.
A contract (NAS 1-430) was signed by NASA and the Western Electric Company in the amount of $33,058,690 for construction and engineering of the Mercury tracking network.

January 12, 1960 (Tuesday)
After seven years, a state of emergency in the British East African colony of Kenya, was lifted by the Governor, Sir Patrick Renison. Proclaimed in 1952 after terrorism by the black nationalist group, the Mau Mau, the emergency regulations set curfews, restricted travel, and required the licensing of printing presses.
Scent of Mystery, presented by Mike Todd, Jr. in "Smell-O-Vision", made its debut, at Chicago's Cinestage Theater, with a system that provided, then cleared, different aromas consistent with the scenes in the film.
Born:  
Dominique Wilkins, American NBA player, in Paris, France 
Oliver Platt, Canadian actor, in Windsor, Ontario
Died: 
Nevil Shute, 60, English novelist (On the Beach) 
"Sweet Daddy" Grace, 76, Los Angeles African-American evangelist

January 13, 1960 (Wednesday)
The first discussions were held in the White House to discuss covert action to overthrow Cuba's new revolutionary socialist government led by prime minister Fidel Castro.  A special group, created by the National Security Council's order #5412, approved "Operation Zapata".
The Soviet Ministry of Internal Affairs (MVD) was abolished, and replaced by separate agencies in the 15 republics.

January 14, 1960 (Thursday)
The Reserve Bank of Australia, authorized by 1959 legislation, began operation, as did the ten-member Reserve Bank Board, which makes decisions on the monetary policy of Australia.
John L. Lewis served his last day as President of the United Mine Workers of America after almost 40 years. He was succeeded by Thomas Kennedy.
Born: Matthew Bourne, English choreographer, in Walthamstow, London

January 15, 1960 (Friday)
The day after Soviet leader Nikita Khrushchev asked the Supreme Soviet of the USSR to formally approve his proposal to reduce the Soviet armed forces by nearly one-third, the 1,300 members in both houses gave their unanimous assent. The reduction, from 3,623,000 men to 2,423,000 men, had been announced by Khrushchev the day before in a speech to the joint session, with a plan to shift defense expenditures to nuclear weapons and missiles. "Should any madman launch an attack on our state or on other socialist states," Khrushchev said,"we would literally be able to wipe the country or countries that attack us off the face of the Earth."
Eight Chicago policemen were arrested in early morning raids on their homes, and charged with burglary, and several carloads of stolen merchandise were seized from the homes. By the end of the month, 15 city cops had been indicted for what Mayor Daley called "the most disgraceful and shocking scandal in the police department's history." The arrests followed a revelation, by a 23-year-old burglar, that several members of the Chicago PD had assisted him in burglarizing businesses in areas they had been assigned to patrol.
A document entitled "Overall Plan for Department of Defense Support for Project Mercury Operations" was reviewed and approved by NASA Headquarters and the Space Task Group.
Based on requirements listed in Space Task Group Working Paper No. 129, covering the Project Mercury recovery force, the U.S. Navy issued "Operation Plan COMDESFLOTFOUR No. 1-60." This plan provided for recovery procedures according to specified areas and for space recovery methods. Procedures for Mercury-Redstone and Mercury-Atlas missions were covered.
Qualification tests on a programer fabricated by the Wheaton Engineering Company for Project Mercury were started and completed by March 28, 1960.

January 16, 1960 (Saturday)
Several thousand police were required to disperse the gathering.
The village of Willowbrook, Illinois, was incorporated.

January 17, 1960 (Sunday)
It was announced that U.S. President Dwight D. Eisenhower would make a ten-day tour of the Soviet Union from June 10 to June 19, 1960, as the guest of Soviet First Secretary Nikita S. Khrushchev.  The visit would never take place, and was called off after the U-2 incident in May.
Born: Charles "Chili" Davis, Jamaican-born American Major League Baseball star and designated hitter, in Kingston

January 18, 1960 (Monday)
Major General Jacques Massu, the commander of the French Army in Algeria, criticized his boss in an interview with Hans Ulrich Kempski of the German newspaper Süddeutsche Zeitung. President Charles De Gaulle, who came into power with the Army's support in 1958, was outraged by Massu's statement that "Perhaps the Army made a mistake."
Capital Airlines Flight 20 crashed near Holdcroft, Virginia, while en route from Washington to Norfolk, apparently killing all forty-six passengers and four crew members on impact. The first persons on the scene heard no cries, and the Vickers Viscount was soon consumed by a fire that burned for five hours.
Walter C. Williams proposed the establishment of a Mercury-Redstone Coordination Committee to monitor and coordinate activities related to Mercury-Redstone flight tests.
A proposal was made by Walter C. Williams, Associate Director of Project Mercury Operations, that the Mercury-Atlas flight test working group become an official and standing coordination body. This group brought together representation from the Space Task Group, Air Force Ballistic Missile Division, Convair Astronautics, McDonnell Aircraft Corporation, and the Atlantic Missile Range. Personnel from these organizations had met informally in the past on several occasions.

January 19, 1960 (Tuesday)
Scandinavian Airlines Flight 871 crashed on its approach to Ankara, killing all 42 aboard.
U.S. President Eisenhower and Japan's Prime Minister Kishi signed the Treaty of Mutual Cooperation and Security between the United States and Japan at the White House. Unpopular in Japan, the treaty was ratified there in June, and Kishi resigned soon afterward.
In keeping with a concept of using certain off-the-shelf hardware items that were available for the manufacture of Project Mercury components, companies around London, England, were visited throughout 1959. Potential English vendors of such items as the SARAH beacon batteries (later chosen), miniature indicators, time delay mechanisms, hydrogen-peroxide systems, and transducers were evaluated. A report of the findings was submitted on this date.
Born:  
Al Joyner, American track star who won an Olympic gold medal in 1984 Olympic in the triple jump, in East St. Louis, Illinois 
Žarko Laušević, Yugoslavian actor until the nation's breakup in 1991, in Cetinje, Socialist Republic of Montenegro

January 20, 1960 (Wednesday)
The Soviet Union successfully test-fired the first ICBM, the R-7 Semyorka, demonstrating a range of at least  when it reached a target area in the Pacific Ocean. The explosion on impact, at  Moscow time (1705 GMT,  EST), was observed by the crew of a Qantas aircraft.
Novato, California, was incorporated.
Born:
Jeff "Tain" Watts, American jazz drummer, in Pittsburgh
Will Wright, American designer of the computer game Sim City; in Atlanta

January 21, 1960 (Thursday)
In the third worst mine disaster in history, 437 coal miners were killed at the Coalbrook North Colliery at Coalbrook, South Africa, when a  section collapsed, filling the mine shaft with methane.
Avianca Flight 671 from New York to Montego Bay, Jamaica, crashed and burned when its landing gear collapsed on touchdown, killing 37 of the 46 persons on board.
At a meeting to draft fiscal year 1962 funding estimates for Project Mercury, the total purchase of Atlas launch vehicles was listed as 15, and the total purchase of Mercury spacecraft was listed as 26.

Test objectives for this flight were the same as those for Little Joe 1 (LJ-1) in which the escape tower launched 31 minutes before the planned launch, and Little Joe 1A (LJ-1A), wherein the dynamic buildup in the abort maneuver was too low. A physiological study of the primate, particularly in areas applying to the effects of the rapid onset of reverse acceleration during abort at maximum dynamic pressure, was also made. In addition, the Mercury helicopter recovery system was exercised. During the mission, all sequences operated as planned. Thirty minutes from launch time, a Marine recovery helicopter deposited the spacecraft and its occupant at Wallops Station. "Miss Sam" was in good condition, and all test objectives were successfully fulfilled.
Died: Wu Lien-teh, 80, Chinese physician who halted the pneumonic plague epidemic of 1910 in China

January 22, 1960 (Friday)
France's President de Gaulle fired Major General Massu from his post as commander of the troops in French Algeria, following Massu's critical interview. European Algerians were outraged by the firing, precipitating the "week of the barricades".
At the Boston Garden, Sugar Ray Robinson lost his world middleweight boxing title in an upset to Paul Pender, a 29-year-old firefighter from Brookline, Massachusetts. Pender outpointed Robinson in fifteen rounds.
Born: Michael Hutchence, Australian rock musician (INXS), in Sydney (d. 1997)

January 23, 1960 (Saturday)
Born: Patrick de Gayardon, French skydiver and skysurfing pioneer, in Oullins (killed in skydiving accident, 1998)

January 24, 1960 (Sunday)
As many as 5,000 European residents of French Algeria, including members of the French home guard, sealed off parts of Algiers and then withdrew behind the barricades. In the crisis that followed, leaders of the French Army told Prime Minister Michel Debre that they would disregard orders to attack the insurgents.  When the local police clashed with the demonstrators, 24 people were killed and 136 injured.
The Democratic Socialist Party (Japan) was formed by Suehiro Nishio and 52 other members of Parliament who had formerly been in the Japan Socialist Party.  The DSP lasted until 1994.
Born: Rick Leventhal, FOX TV newsman, in Silver Spring, Maryland
Died:  
Edwin Fischer, 73, Swiss classical pianist 
Ashihei Hino, 53, Japanese novelist, committed suicide

January 25, 1960 (Monday)
Belgium agreed to grant its African colony, in the Belgian Congo, independence, setting a date of June 30, 1960, and elections to be held in May.
McDonnell delivered the first production-type Mercury spacecraft to the Space Task Group at Langley Research Center in less than 1 year from the signing of the formal contract. This spacecraft was a structural shell and did not contain most of the internal systems that would be required for human spaceflight. After receipt, the Space Task Group instrumented the spacecraft and designated it for the Mercury-Atlas 1 (MA-1) flight.
Wilt Chamberlain set an NBA record that still stands, for "Most points, rookie, game", with 58 points for the Philadelphia Warriors against the Detroit Pistons, in Bethlehem, Pennsylvania. The record was tied, by Chamberlain, on February 21 of his rookie year.

January 26, 1960 (Tuesday)
After 22 ballots to select the new National Football League Commissioner, Marshall Leahy had seven votes, Austin Gunsel had four, but neither candidate had the required 10 of 12 majority needed for the 12-team league.  The compromise was the little-known general manager of the Los Angeles Rams, 33-year-old Pete Rozelle.  Rozelle would go on to lead the NFL to become the most popular professional sports league in the United States.
In Burnsville, West Virginia, Burnsville High School student Danny Heater set an interscholastic record for basketball, scoring 135 points in a 173–43 win over  Widen, West Virginia's high school team.

January 27, 1960 (Wednesday)
Following Japan's signing of the new security treaty with the United States, the Soviet Union announced that it was cancelling plans to return the islands of Habomai and Shikotan, captured during World War II, to Japan.
Construction began on the Baitul Mukarram mosque in Dhaka, East Pakistan.  The structure, designed by Abdul Hussain Thariani, is now the National Mosque of Bangladesh.
A river of lava from the Kilauea Volcano spilled over the last earthen dike that had protected the village of Kapoho, Hawai'i, and began the destruction of the town, whose 300 residents had been evacuated.  By Saturday, Kapoho was gone.
Thirty-one people were trampled to death in Seoul, South Korea, when a crowd surged forward to catch a train.

January 28, 1960 (Thursday)
The 12-team NFL expanded for the first time since 1949, awarding the franchise for the Dallas Cowboys for 1960, and for the Minnesota Vikings for 1961.
China and Burma (now Myanmar) signed an agreement specifying the boundary between the two nations.
Died: Zora Neale Hurston, 69, African-American author who would attain posthumous fame in the 1970s

January 29, 1960 (Friday)
Facing a challenge from rebelling European settlers in French Algeria, France's President Charles de Gaulle went on television in his Army uniform, in order, he said, "to stress that I am speaking as General de Gaulle as well as chief of state".  Having announced before that the future of French territory in Algeria would be left to the Algerian Arab majority, de Gaulle emphasized that he would not yield to Europeans "who dream of being usurpers".  Following the speech, the French Army ended speculation about whether they would side  with the Algerian Europeans against the Paris government, and ordered all home guardsmen, inside the barricades, to report to their headquarters.  When the order was disobeyed, the Army moved in to end the rebellion.
Born:  
Greg Louganis, American diver, Olympic medalist, in El Cajon, California 
Gia Carangi, American supermodel and AIDS sufferer, in Philadelphia (d. 1986) 
Matthew Ashford, American soap opera actor (Days of Our Lives), in Davenport, Iowa

January 30, 1960 (Saturday)
The American Football League filled out its eight teams by voting on where to place the franchise that had formerly been reserved for Minneapolis.  Although a majority preferred to place an AFL team in Atlanta, the owners agreed that a second California team was needed, and the team became the Oakland Raiders (later the Los Angeles Raiders, now the Las Vegas Raiders).
Died: J. C. Kumarappa, 68, Indian economist and father of "Gandhian economics"

January 31, 1960 (Sunday)
At Tawfiq, a skirmish between soldiers from Israel and Syria (at that time, part of the United Arab Republic with Egypt) left 12 Syrians and 7 Israelis dead. UAR President Gamal Abdel Nasser sent Egyptian troops back into the Sinai in response. (→ Rotem Crisis, Reprisal operations)
Joseph McNeill, a 17-year-old college freshman, was turned away by a waitress with the words, "We don't serve Negroes," when he tried to get something to eat at the bus terminal in Greensboro, North Carolina. When he talked about it with three friends at North Carolina Agricultural and Technical College, the four African-American students decided that they would take a stand against segregation. The next day, the four would sit down at the Woolworth's Department Store lunch counter and refuse to get up until they were served, and the "sit-in" was created as a form of civil disobedience.
Six chimpanzees were rated as being trained and ready to support Mercury-Redstone or Mercury-Atlas missions. Other chimpanzees were being shipped from Africa to enter the animal training program.

References

1960
1960-01
1960-01